The 1977 All-Ireland Senior Camogie Championship Final was the 46th All-Ireland Final and the deciding match of the 1977 All-Ireland Senior Camogie Championship, an inter-county camogie tournament for the top teams in Ireland.

Kilkenny won a one-sided game. A young Angela Downey was the star, and scored 2-3.

References

All-Ireland Senior Camogie Championship Finals
All-Ireland Senior Camogie Championship Final
All-Ireland Senior Camogie Championship Final
All-Ireland Senior Camogie Championship Final, 1977